James Pavelec is an artist whose work has appeared in role-playing games.

Career
His Dungeons & Dragons work includes interior art for Races of Faerûn (2003), Unapproachable East (2003), Underdark (2003), Unearthed Arcana (2004), Planar Handbook (2004), Expanded Psionics Handbook (2004), Player's Guide to Faerûn (2004), Complete Divine (2004), Serpent Kingdoms (2004), Lost Empires of Faerûn (2005), Rules Compendium (2007), Thunderspire Labyrinth (2008), King of the Trollhaunt Warrens (2008), and Martial Power (2008).

He is known for his work on the Magic: The Gathering collectible card game.

His comics work has included Star Wars: Knights of the Old Republic (2009) for Dark Horse.

References

External links
 Jim Pavelec's website
 

Living people
Place of birth missing (living people)
Role-playing game artists
Year of birth missing (living people)